Paul Frommelt (born 9 August 1957) is a former Alpine skier from Liechtenstein and young brother of Willi Frommelt.

Career
In the 1970s and 1980s he belonged to the Liechtenstein skiing team together with the siblings Andreas Wenzel and Hanni Wenzel. He was a slalom specialist and he won four slalom competitions in the World Cup. He also came third at the 1978 World Championships in Garmisch-Partenkirchen. At the 1988 Winter Olympics in Calgary he won a bronze medal in the slalom competition.

Up to the 2014 Winter Olympics, Liechtenstein has won nine medals in its history of competition in the Winter Olympics, with eight of these medals achieved by two sets of siblings –  Paul and his brother Willi (bronze in the slalom race in the 1976 Winter Olympics) are responsible for two medals, while Hanni Wenzel (2 gold-medals and a silver-medal in the 1980 Winter Olympics and a bronze-medal in the 1976 Winter Olympics) and her brother Andreas (a silver medal in the 1980 Winter Olympics and a bronze medal in the 1984 Winter Olympics) are responsible for six more. The ninth one (a bronze in the female Slalom Race in the 1984 Winter Olympics) was won by Ursula Konzett.

World cup victories

References

External links
 
 

1957 births
Living people
Liechtenstein male alpine skiers
Olympic alpine skiers of Liechtenstein
Olympic bronze medalists for Liechtenstein
Olympic medalists in alpine skiing
Medalists at the 1988 Winter Olympics
Alpine skiers at the 1976 Winter Olympics
Alpine skiers at the 1980 Winter Olympics
Alpine skiers at the 1984 Winter Olympics
Alpine skiers at the 1988 Winter Olympics